The Trialeti Ossetians are a group of ethnic Ossetians, settling the central Georgian districts of Khashuri and Borjomi, historically part of the Trialeti province. The Ossetians resettled there in the 19th century from the territory, which is now known as South Ossetia). The area where they live has sometimes been referred to as Trialetian Ossetia.

In 1922, after the conflict between the Georgian government forces and Bolshevik-sympathizing Ossetian rebels, and the forcible Sovietization of Georgia, the recently created South Ossetian Autonomous Oblast within the Georgian SSR claimed the villages, mainly settled by Ossetians in Trialeti as its exclave - to no avail, however.

In 1989 there were 38,000 Ossetians in the region, living in 134 villages. They had been incorporated into the Georgian society with a high degree of intermarriages with Georgians. During the 1991–1992 South Ossetia War, the area was unaffected by armed confrontation, but many Ossetian families had to flee rising ethnic discord to South Ossetia and Russia's North Ossetia–Alania.

References

Social history of Georgia (country)
Ethnic groups in Georgia (country)
Ossetian people